The Clásica del Oeste-Doble Bragado is a road cycling race held in Argentina. The race exists as a men's competition over seven stages.

Past winners

References
 Results

Cycle races in Argentina
Recurring sporting events established in 1922
Men's road bicycle races
1922 establishments in Argentina